Elmwood Plantation is a historic plantation house located near Gatesville, Gates County, North Carolina.  It was built about 1822, and is a two-story, three bay, Federal period frame building.  It has a side-hall plan and a two-story, two bay, rectangular side wing.  Also on the property is a gambrel-roof frame kitchen, thought to be only one of its kind in North Carolina.

It was listed on the National Register of Historic Places in 1972.

References

Plantation houses in North Carolina
Houses on the National Register of Historic Places in North Carolina
Federal architecture in North Carolina
Houses completed in 1822
Houses in Gates County, North Carolina
National Register of Historic Places in Gates County, North Carolina
1822 establishments in North Carolina